Following are the results of the 1947 Soviet First League football championship. Sixty seven teams took part in the competition, with Lokomotiv Moscow winning the championship.

Qualifying stage

Central Zone

Russian Zone 1

Russian Zone 2

Ukraine
The zone was formed from the 5 teams of the 1946 Vtoraya Gruppa season competing in the Southern Zone and top-8 of the 1946 Football Championship of the Ukrainian SSR. Only instead of Spartak Kyiv, there was admitted Moldavian representative Dynamo Kishenev (possibly based on Spartak Kishenev).

Caucasus Zone

Central Asia Zone

Final stage

Number of teams by republics

See also
 1947 Soviet First Group
 1947 Soviet Cup

References

External links
 1947 Soviet Second Group. RSSSF.

1947
2
Soviet
Soviet